WOM magazin was a freely distributed German music magazine. The magazine was founded in Kiel in 1982. It was discontinued in 2009, with the double December 2008/January 2009 issue being the last one.

The magazine is replaced with the online version "WOM World of Music", a division of jpc-schallplatten Versandhandelsgesellschaft mbH, available in English and German.

References

2009 disestablishments in Germany
Defunct magazines published in Germany
Free magazines
German-language magazines
Music magazines published in Germany
Magazines established in 1982
Magazines disestablished in 2009